"Adalida" is a song recorded by American country music artist George Strait. It was released in March 1995 as the third single from his album Lead On.  It peaked at number 3 in the United States, and number 2 in Canada.  It was written by Mike Geiger, Woody Mullis and Michael Huffman.

Content
The song is an uptempo, in which the narrator refers to a "Cajun queen" named Adalida.
It was inspired by a young lady George Strait met in his hometown, named Ida. He was about to sing at the strawberry festival in Poteet, when he ran into her.

Critical reception
Deborah Evans Price, of Billboard magazine reviewed the song favorably, calling it a "zydeco-spiced single." She goes on to say that in the hands of a lesser singer, "a song like this would have been difficult to stretch." Alanna Nash of Entertainment Weekly was less favorable, saying that it "fails to challenge him in even the slightest way".

Chart positions
"Adalida" debuted at number 72 on the U.S. Billboard Hot Country Singles & Tracks for the week of March 25, 1995.

Year-end charts

Cover Versions
 In October 2012, Tim Armstrong recorded a version as a part of his Tim Timebomb and Friends project

References

1994 songs
1995 singles
George Strait songs
Song recordings produced by Tony Brown (record producer)
Songs written by Mike Geiger
Songs written by Woody Mullis
MCA Records singles